Northside is a neighborhood in northern Lexington, Kentucky, United States. Its boundaries are Loudon Avenue to the north and east, Short Street, Midland Avenue, and Winchester Road to the south, and Newtown Pike to the west.

Neighborhood statistics
 Population in 2000: 3,875
 Land area: 
 Population density:  6,774 people per square mile (2,618.2 km2)
 Median household income:  $26,159

Gallery
Numerous buildings and corridors in Lexington's Northside neighborhood are on the National Register of Historic Places, including:

References

Neighborhoods in Lexington, Kentucky